is a 1990 one-shot anime. It was published in English by ADV Films. Enoki Films USA licensed the series as Jun and Sarah: Sacrifice of the Evil Spirit.

Jonathan Clements and Helen McCarthy, authors of The Anime Encyclopedia, Revised & Expanded Edition: A Guide to Japanese Animation Since 1917, described the work as being "in the spirit of the later Slayers.

Characters
Clements and McCarthy describe the main characters, Efera and Jiliora, as being "modeled rather obviously on the Dirty Pair".
 Efera
 In the Japanese version, she is Efe (エフェ). Enoki Films named her Princess Juniana "Jun".
 Jiliora
 In the Japanese version, she is Jeila (ジーラ Jīra). Enoki Films named her Lady Saraphina-Effra "Sarah".
 Orlin (オーリン Ōrin)
 A friend of Efera and Jiliora who helps them escape. Named Orin by Enoki Films.
 Kilian (キリアン Kirian)
 Kilian is a boy who helps Efera and Jiliora escape. He dies. Named Kirian by Enoki Films.
 Yurion (ユリオン)
 Kilian's brother.
 Rubiera (ルビエラ)
 Kilian's sister.
 Baron Celdion (セルディオン Serudion)
 A man planning to take over various places.
 Holy Supreme Mother (皇母)
 An evil goddess. Named Kira by Enoki Films.

References

External links
 
 Gude Crest at ADV Films (Archive)
 Jun and Sarah'' at Enoki Films

1990 anime films
ADV Films
J.C.Staff